Seahorse Spirit was a multi-purpose vessel operated by Defence Maritime Services under contract to the Royal Australian Navy (RAN). She was based at Westernport, Victoria.

Citations

References
 
 

1979 ships
Ships built in Newfoundland and Labrador